"Hold On (If You Believe in Love)" is a song by Dutch electronic music vocalist CB Milton, released in 1994 as the fourth single from his debut album, It's My Loving Thing (1994). It achieved moderate success in Europe, peaking at number 15 in both Belgium and Finland, number 33 in the Netherlands, and number 62 on the UK Singles Chart. A music video was also produced to promote the single.

Critical reception
Pan-European magazine Music & Media wrote that "this single is more or less styled after the golden age of Stock. Aitken & Waterman". They later added, "Whereas all competitors use hordes of female backing vocalists and a male rapper, a cheap sequencer, a simple pop song and his own voice is all this Euro dance singer needs." A reviewer from Music Week rated it three out of five, commenting, "CB's excellent debut single "It's A Loving Thing" deserved more chart glory than its number 32 peak. The follow-up, in the same frantic Eurobeat vein, will do well to go higher." James Hamilton from the RM Dance Update declared it as a "doubtless smashbound gruffy melodic exciting Belgia galloper from the 2 Unlimited stable".

Track listing

Charts

References

 

1994 singles
1994 songs
Byte Records singles
CB Milton songs
Electronic songs
English-language Dutch songs
Logic Records singles
Songs written by Peter Bauwens
Songs written by Phil Wilde